Rakeh (also Romanized as Rākeh; also known as Rakbeh) is a village in Jahangiri Rural District, in the Central District of Masjed Soleyman County, Khuzestan Province, Iran. At the 2006 census, its population was 62, in 12 families.

References 

Populated places in Masjed Soleyman County